Mopeia District is a district of Zambezia Province in Mozambique.

Further reading
District profile (PDF)

Districts in Zambezia Province